The following is a comprehensive list of awards received by Julio Iglesias.

ALMA Award

 
|-
|align="center"|2002
|Julio Iglesias
|Outstanding Spanish Language Performance in a Television Special (shared with Alejandro Fernández)
|
|-

Grammy Awards

 
|-
|align="center"|1981
|Hey!
|rowspan=2|Best Latin Recording
|
|-
|align="center"|1983
|Momentos
|
|-
|align="center"|1985
|As Time Goes By (with Willie Nelson)
|Best Country Performance by a Duo or Group with Vocal
|
|-
|align="center"|1988
|Un hombre solo 
|rowspan=4|Best Latin Pop Album
|
|-
|align="center"|1993
|Calor 
|
|-
|align="center"|1996
|La Carretera 
|
|-
|align="center"|1998
|Tango 
|
|-
|align="center"|2019
|
|Lifetime Achievement Award
|
|-

Country Music Association Awards

|-
|align="center"|1984
|Willie Nelson & Julio Iglesias
|Vocal Duo of the Year
|
|-

References

Iglesias, Julio
Awards